During the 2006–07 Spanish football season, Real Madrid Castilla competed in the Segunda División.

Season summary
Real Madrid Castilla were relegated to the Segunda División B at the end of the season.

Squad
Squad at end of season

Left club during season

Starting

Transfers

In

Out

Results

Segunda División

Top scorers

References

Real Madrid Castilla seasons
Real Madrid Castilla